Polichne was a town in the northwest of ancient Messenia, situated on the road from Andania to Dorium and Cyparissia.

Its site is tentatively located near the modern Kopanaki/Stylari.

References

Populated places in ancient Messenia
Former populated places in Greece